Trenchtown Mix Up was The Gladiators' debut LP, recorded at Joe Gibbs' studio and released in 1976 on TR International/Virgin Records'. It included re-recordings of two songs originally recorded at Studio One ("Mix Up", originally titled "Bongo Red", and their 1968 debut release "Hello Carol"), and also included cover versions of Bob Marley's "Soul Rebel" and "Rude Boy Ska". Jo-Ann Greene, writing for Allmusic, said of the album: "Everything about this set is masterful, and it remains a classic".

Track listing
All songs by Albert Griffiths unless noted.
Side One

 "Mix Up" - 3.00
 "Bellyfull" - 2.18
 "Looks is Deceiving" - 2.30
 "Chatty Chatty Mouth" - 3.16
 "Soul Rebel" - 3.54 (Bob Marley)

Side Two

 "Eli Eli" - 3.03
 "Hearsay" - 3.06
 "Rude Boy Ska" - 2.26 (Bob Marley)
 "Know Yourself Mankind" - 2.50
 "Thief in the Night" - 3.39
 "Hello Carol" - 3.36

Personnel
"Prince" Tony Robinson - Producer
Albert Griffiths - Lead Guitar, Vocals
Clinton Fearon - Bass Guitar, Vocals
Gallimore Sutherland - Rhythm Guitar, Vocals 
Lloyd Parks - Bass
"Sly" Dunbar - Drums
Uziah "Sticky" Thompson - Percussion

References

External links
Trenchtown Mix Up at Roots Archives

1976 debut albums
The Gladiators (band) albums
Virgin Records albums